A Massachusetts general election was held on November 4, 1958 in the Commonwealth of Massachusetts.

The election included:
 statewide elections for United States Senator, Governor, Lieutenant Governor, Attorney General, Secretary of the Commonwealth, Treasurer, and Auditor;
 district elections for U.S. Representatives, State Representatives, State Senators, and Governor's Councillors; and
 ballot questions at the state and local levels.

Democratic and Republican candidates were selected in party primaries held on September 9, 1958.

Governor 

Democrat Foster Furcolo was re-elected over Republican Charles Gibbons, Socialist Labor candidate Henning A. Blomen, and Prohibition candidate Guy S. Williams.

George Fingold was the only candidate in the Republican primary, however he died nine days before the primary. Gibbons won the nomination as a write-in candidate.

Lieutenant Governor 

Democrat Robert F. Murphy was re-elected Lieutenant Governor over Republican Elmer C. Nelson, Socialist Labor candidate Francis A. Votano, and Prohibition candidate Harold E. Bassett.

Democratic primary

Candidates 
 Robert F. Murphy, incumbent Lieutenant Governor

Results 
Lt. Governor Murphy was unopposed for renomination.

Republican primary

Candidates 
 Elmer C. Nelson, former Chair of the Massachusetts Republican Party

Results 
Nelson was unopposed for the Republican nomination.

General election

Results

Attorney General 

Incumbent Attorney General George Fingold ran for Governor instead of seeking reelection. He died on August 31, 1958 and Edward J. McCormack Jr., who won the Democratic primary over Endicott Peabody, was chosen by the Massachusetts General Court to finish his term.

McCormack defeated Republican Christian A. Herter Jr., Socialist Workers candidate Charles A. Couper, and Prohibition candidate Gustaf B. Nissan in the general election.

Democratic primary

Candidates
Edward J. McCormack Jr., former Boston City Council member and nominee for Attorney General in 1956
Endicott Peabody, former Governor Council member from Lawrence

Results

General election

Results

Secretary of the Commonwealth 

Incumbent Secretary of the Commonwealth Edward J. Cronin defeated Republican Marion Curran Boch, Socialist Labor candidate Fred M. Ingersoll, and Prohibition candidate Julia Kohler in the general election.

General election

Results

Aftermath
Cronin died 20 days after the election.

Treasurer and Receiver-General 

Incumbent Treasurer and Receiver-General John Francis Kennedy defeated Woburn Mayor William G. Shaughnessy in the Democratic primary and Republican State Senator John Yerxa, Socialist Labor candidate John Erlandsson, and Prohibition candidate Warren Carberg in the general election.

Democratic primary

Candidates
 John Francis Kennedy, incumbent Treasurer
 William G. Shaughnessy, mayor of Woburn

Results

General election

Results

Auditor 
Incumbent Auditor Thomas J. Buckley defeated Republican Thomas H. Adams, Socialist Labor candidate Arne Sortell, and Prohibition candidate John B. Lauder in the general election.

United States Senator 

Democrat John F. Kennedy was re-elected over Republican Vincent J. Celeste, Socialist Labor candidate Lawrence Gilfedder, and Prohibition candidate Mark R. Shaw.

References 

 
Massachusetts